The foxy cisticola (Cisticola troglodytes) is a species of bird in the family Cisticolidae.

It is native to Central African Republic (Bozoum and Manovo-Gounda St. Floris National Park), Democratic Republic of the Congo (Garamba National Park), Ethiopia (Gambela National Park), Kenya (Mount Elgon), Sudan (Ashana-Bandingilo-Dinder-Imatong Mountains and Juba) and Uganda (Kidepo Valley National Park, Mt Kie Forest, Mt. Moroto Forest Reserve and Mt Otzi Forest Reserve). It is also known to be vagrant to Mali. Its natural habitats are subtropical or tropical dry forest, dry savanna, and subtropical or tropical seasonally wet or flooded lowland grassland.

References
Notes

Bibliography
 BirdLife Species Factsheet ." www.birdlife.org . 1 BirdLife Species Factsheet. 3 Mar. 2008 <http://www.birdlife.org/print.html?url=%2Fdatazone%2Fsites%2Findex.html%3Faction%3DSpcHTMDetails.asp%26sid%3D7349%26m%3D1>.

foxy cisticola
Birds of Sub-Saharan Africa
foxy cisticola
Taxonomy articles created by Polbot